Japan competed at the 1984 Summer Paralympics in Stoke Mandeville, Great Britain and New York City, United States. 37 competitors from Japan won 24 medals including 9 gold, 7 silver and 8 bronze and finished 22nd in the medal table.

See also 
 Japan at the Paralympics
 Japan at the 1984 Summer Olympics

References 

1984
1984 in Japanese sport
Nations at the 1984 Summer Paralympics